Karina may refer to:

People
Karina (name), a female given name (including a list of people with the given name)
Karina (American singer) (born 1991)
Karina (Spanish singer) (born 1946)
Karina (Venezuelan singer) (born 1968)
Elda Neyis Mosquera (alias Karina, born 1963), Colombian guerrilla commander

Other uses
Karina, Sierra Leone
Kalina people, an indigenous people of South America
Karina station, a light rail station in San Jose, California
"Karina", a song by Menahan Street Band on the album Make the Road by Walking
MV Karina, a passenger ship
Karina, an assassin hero in the game Mobile Legends: Bang Bang

See also
Carina (disambiguation)
Kareena, a given name